WBHB-FM is an active rock music formatted broadcast radio station licensed to Waynesboro, Pennsylvania, serving "Four-State" area (Maryland, Pennsylvania, Virginia and West Virginia).  WBHB-FM is owned and operated by M. Belmont Verstandig, Inc.

History

Beginning in the late 1970s, then WAYZ 101.5 FM was a country-formatted station.  In its early days, WAYZ was always the second country station in the Hagerstown market, generally dominated by Y96 WYII (now WICL).

Over a period of years it became the top-rated station in the market. VerStandig bought powerhouse FM 104.7 from John Staub (Hagerstown Broadcasting) and moved the WAYZ country format there in 2000.  They were left with FM 101.5 and for 3 weeks it broadcast an audio CNN headline news format.  Top 40 "Magic 101.5" debuted on August 28, 2000, and stuck around until March 2005, during which 101.5 became a top-rated station in the Hagerstown market.

On March 1, 2005, 101.5 was renamed to "Eagle 101.5" with a classic rock format.  Nassau Broadcasting-owned WARX changed to a classic hits format as WWEG "106.9 The Eagle" the same week.  Nassau sued Verstandig for the use of the "Eagle" moniker, even though Verstandig used it first, and 101.5 was renamed to just "Classic Rock 101.5" and their calls to WFYN .  WFYN has been in the top 3 in most ratings, while WAYZ 104.7 remains the dominant market leader with its country format. On September 17, 2007, WFYN segued from Classic Rock to Active Rock as "Rock 101.5".

On March 16, 2009, WFYN became WBHB-FM and changed its "Rock 101.5" branding to "101.5 Bob Rocks", it continues to carry an active rock format.  The station dropped Nights with Alice Cooper and picked up HardDriveXL with Lou Brutus". WBHB-FM continues to lead WWEG in the ratings.

Signal Note

External links
101.5 Bob Rocks Online

BHB-FM
Radio stations established in 1959
1959 establishments in Pennsylvania
Active rock radio stations in the United States